Pyrola chlorantha, the greenflowered wintergreen, is a species of the plant genus Pyrola. It has a circumboreal distribution and is found throughout the northern latitudes of Eurasia and North America.

Pyrola chlorantha is found in the Northeastern United States and the Western United States, such as the Sierra Nevada in California. It is considered an endangered species in several of the U.S. states.

References

External links
Pyrola chlorantha
Jepson Manual Treatment

chlorantha
Flora of Canada
Flora of Europe
Flora of temperate Asia
Flora of the Northeastern United States
Flora of the Western United States
Flora of Alaska
Flora of California
Flora of the Great Lakes region (North America)
Taxa named by Olof Swartz
Flora without expected TNC conservation status